Iridopsis vellivolata, the large purplish gray, is a species of geometrid moth in the family Geometridae. It is found in North America.

The MONA or Hodges number for Iridopsis vellivolata is 6582.

References

Further reading

 

Boarmiini
Articles created by Qbugbot
Moths described in 1881